Casearia engleri is a species of flowering plant in the family Salicaceae. It is endemic to Tanzania.

References

Flora of Tanzania
engleri
Vulnerable plants
Taxonomy articles created by Polbot